Brady Barnett (born 18 November 1989) is a New Zealand first-class cricketer who played for Wellington and Central Districts.

References

External links
 

1989 births
Living people
New Zealand cricketers
Central Districts cricketers
Wellington cricketers
Cricketers from Motueka